Teh Peng Huat (born  1937) is a Malaysian badminton coach based in Bukit Mertajam, Seberang Perai, Penang who coaches local youth players. He is best-known for spotting Lee Chong Wei and bringing Lee under his tutelage in the early 1990s, and credited with quickly developing Lee into a national junior champion. He also developed many other kids into professional badminton players, including Goh Jin Wei, Chin Eei Hui, Cheam June Wei, Tee Jing Yi, Nelson Heg, and Cheah Yee See.

He received Penang's Best Coach award in 2004. The story of how he went out of his way to convince Lee Chong Wei's father to let him coach Chong Wei—including making a promise to waive Chong Wei's fees and offering to send Chong Wei home after every training session—has been reported by international media. In the 2018 biopic Lee Chong Wei, Teh is portrayed by actor Alvin Wong.

References

External links

Badminton coaches
Malaysian people of Hokkien descent
Malaysian people of Chinese descent
People from Penang
Living people
1937 births